Petersburg Tram Mechanical Factory (PTMF) (ПТМЗ) was one of the leading manufacturers of tramcars in Russia and the CIS-countries located in Saint Petersburg. As the only tram manufacturing plant in Russia for several decades (until 1981), it was the sole supplier of rolling stock for the tram system in St. Petersburg.

History
Founded in 1929 as a tram repair plant, it was rebuilt in 1933 into a tram manufacturing enterprise for the city of Leningrad (now Saint Petersburg). At that time, it produced LM and LP trams. During the ceremony for the first tram produced and leaving the plant, S. Kirov was present. By the spring of 1934 the plant was moved to Chugunnaya Street. 
By the beginning of the German-Soviet War the plant was temporarily rebuilt for producing warfare and engine repair. 
Since 1944 the plant produced trams. 
In 1966 the first 6-axle articulated tram in USSR was produced on the plant, designated as LVS-66. 
Since 1986 a serial production of LVS-86 had been started. 
In 1970-80 the plant was renamed to Leningrad plant of City Transport Repair.
In 1993 the enterprise was privatized and incorporated and renamed St Petersburg Tram Mechanical Plant.
Since 2003 the plants entered "Dedal" group and since 2005 came under the management of "Дедал-Вагоны" (the managing company of  "vagonmash" and "St Petersburg Tram Mechanical Plant").
As of September 2006 the plant produces LM-99 tramcars of various modifications, supplied to Saint Petersburg, Moscow, and other cities in Russia.
 In June 2006 the plant built the experimental sample LVS-2005 tramcar, which became a prototype of the new line of low-floor trams.
In September 2007 the plant got an export contract with Odessa Electric Transport in Ukraine for supplying 11 4-axle tramcars LM-99 ЭМН.
In 2008 the experimental usage of LM-2008 started.
By April 2008 the plant won the open competition for supplying trams for the state needs of St Petersburg. 
16 6 axle "Pioneer" model 71-152, 
29 4 axle 71-134А "Solo". 
By the summer of 2008 the plant won the competition to supply three-section trams with a capacity of 350 people for a second turn of Volgograd Speed Tramскоростного. The first of such trams was released in 2008, with the second in May 2009.
By the summer of 2008 St Petersburg officials stated that in 2009 they may lose the right to supply trams for St Petersburg, yet this did not happen. 
By the summer of 2009 nine four-axle LM-2008 tramcars were supplied in Saint Petersburg, and one single-ended 8-axle train in Kiev. By the autumn of 2008 was supplied to Moscow and LVS-2005 to Barnaul. In Winter - LM-2008 to Moscow, St Petersburg, and Donetsk.
In May 2013 went bankrupt and is currently defunct.

Product line

Trams 
 LM–33 (1933-1939), four-axle
 LM–36 (1936-?)
 LM–47 (1948-1949), four-axle
 LM–49 (1949-1960)
 LP–49 (1949-1960, 1965-1968), trailer van for LM49
 LM–57 (1957-1968)
 LM–68 (1968-1974)
 LM–68M (1974-1992)
 LV–S80 (1980-1984), six-axle articulated tram
 LWS–86 (71-86, 1987-1997), six-axle articulated tram
 LM–93 (71-132, 1993-1999), four-axle tram
 LWS–93 (1993-1994), eight-axle articulated three-section tram
 LWS–97 (71-147, 1997-2004), six-axle articulated tram
 LM–99 (71-134, 1999-2005), four-axle tram
 LM–99 AV/AVN/AE/AEN (2005-2008), modernised LM99 version with updated bodywork
 LM–2000 (2000-2005)
 LWS–2005 (71-152, 2006-2009), six-axle articulated tram with a variable level of the floor
 LM–2008 (71-153, 2008-2012), four-axle tram  with a variable level of the floor
 LWS–2009 (2008-2012), two-sided three-piece articulated tram

Trolleybuses 
 PTZ210 (2000-2004), four-door
 PTZ5283 (2000-2004), four-door

Gallery

References

External links 

 PTMF website

Manufacturing companies based in Saint Petersburg
Tram manufacturers
Manufacturing companies of the Soviet Union
Defunct companies of Russia
Electric vehicle manufacturers of Russia